Samarjitsinh Ranjitsinh Gaekwad (born 25 April 1967) is a cricket administrator and former first-class cricketer. Samarjitsinh Gaekwad is the king of baroda in Gujarat (India). He received the larger portion of the family's fortune in a 2013 settlement.

Early life and family 
Samarjitsinh was born on 25 April 1967 as the only son of Ranjitsinh Pratapsinh Gaekwad and Shubhanginiraje. He studied at The Doon School in Dehradun where he simultaneously captained the school's cricket, football and tennis teams. 

After the death of his father in May 2012, Samarjitsinh was crowned Maharaja in a traditional ceremony at Laxmi Vilas Palace on 22 June 2012. He also obtained control of temples trust that operates 17 temples in Gujarat and in Banaras, Uttar Pradesh.

Personal life 
Since 2002, Samarjitsinh is married to Radhikaraje, who is from the royal family of Wankaner State; the couple has two daughters. The four of them, along with Shubhanginiraje, live in the Laxmi Vilas Palace, which is the largest private residence in India. After becoming Maharaja, Samarjitsinh opened a section of the palace complex as a banquet facility for private ceremonies under his Laxmi Vilas Banquets venture.

Samarjitsinh joined Bharatiya Janata Party in November 2014, but is inactive in politics as of 2017.

Cricket  career 
Samarjitsinh played cricket for Baroda in the Ranji Trophy. He appeared in six first-class matches as a top-order batsman between the 1987/88 and 1988/89 seasons. He later became a cricket administrator and served as the president of the Baroda Cricket Association. As of 2015, he runs a cricket academy at the Moti Bagh Stadium. Apart from cricket, he played golf and built a 10-hole golf course and clubhouse at the Laxmi Vilas Palace complex.

Footnotes

References

External links 
 

1967 births
Living people
Indian cricketers
Baroda cricketers
Indian cricket administrators
Gaekwad dynasty
The Doon School alumni
Bharatiya Janata Party politicians from Gujarat